Patate is a town in Ecuador in the Tungurahua Province in northwestern South America between San Juan de Ambato and Baños. It is close to the foothills of the still active  Tungurahua volcano.

Patate was declared a Pueblo Mágico (magical town) by Ecuador's Ministry of Tourism (MINTUR) in 2019. It was the first town in the country to be awarded this distinction.

References 

 www.inec.gob.ec
 Statistical Data Patate
 Patate location in the GIS system of the Province of Tungurahua
 www.ame.gob.ec

External links 
 Map of the Tungurahua Province
 http://www.tungurahua.gob.ec/main/

Populated places in Tungurahua Province